Elizabeth Macdonald Sellars (6 May 1921 – 30 December 2019) was a Scottish actress.

Early life and education
Sellars was born in Glasgow, Scotland, the daughter of Stephen Sellars and Jean Sutherland. She appeared on the stage from the age of 15, and trained at the Royal Academy of Dramatic Art. She also studied law for five years in England.

Career 
Sellars worked with ENSA during World War II, entertaining British troops. She made her first London stage appearance in 1946 in The Brothers Karamazov, directed by Peter Brook and sharing the stage with Alec Guinness. She later appeared with the Royal Shakespeare Company as Elizabeth in Richard III, Helen in Troilus and Cressida, Gertrude in Hamlet, and Hermione in The Winter's Tale. She played opposite Valentine Dyall, Louise Hampton, and Anthony Ireland in The Other Side, at the Comedy Theatre, London, in 1946.

Sellars entered films with Floodtide (1949), part of an all-Scottish cast, including Gordon Jackson. She appeared in a string of British films in the 1950s and 1960s, and also a few Hollywood films, usually in secondary roles, including The Barefoot Contessa (1954), Désirée (1954), Prince of Players (1955), The Day They Robbed the Bank of England (1960), 55 Days at Peking (1963), and The Chalk Garden (1964). She was the main female lead in a number of films, including The Long Memory (1953), The Last Man to Hang (1956), Never Let Go (1960), and The Webster Boy (1962). She also appeared frequently on television, most notably in A Voyage Round My Father (1982) with Laurence Olivier.

Personal life
On 8 September 1960, Sellars married surgeon Francis Austin Henley in Stow-on-the-Wold, England. They remained together until his death on 31 January 2009. Sellars died on 30 December 2019 at her home in France, aged 98 years.

Partial filmography

Floodtide (1949) as Judy
Madeleine (1950) as Christina Hackett
Guilt Is My Shadow (1950) as Linda
Cloudburst (1951) as Carol Graham
Night Was Our Friend (1951) as Sally Raynor
Hunted (1952) as Magda Lloyd
The Gentle Gunman (1952) as Maureen Fagan
The Long Memory (1953) as Fay Lowther
The Broken Horseshoe (1953) as Della Freeman
Recoil (1953) as Jean Talbot
Three's Company (1953) as Diane Graham (segment "The Surgeon's Story")
Forbidden Cargo (1954) as Rita Compton
The Barefoot Contessa (1954) as Jerry Dawes
Désirée (1954) as Julie Clary, Désirée's Sister
Prince of Players (1955) as Asia Booth
Three Cases of Murder (1955) as Elizabeth ("You Killed Elizabeth" segment)
The Last Man to Hang (1956) as Daphne Strood
The Man in the Sky (1957) as Mary Mitchell
The Shiralee (1957) as Marge
Law and Disorder (1958) as Gina Laselle
Jet Storm (1959) as Inez Barrington
The Day They Robbed the Bank of England (1960) as Iris Muldoon
Never Let Go (1960) as Anne Cummings
The Webster Boy (1962) as Margaret Webster
55 Days at Peking (1963) as Lady Sarah Robertson
The Chalk Garden (1964) as Olivia
The Mummy's Shroud (1967) as Barbara Preston
The Hireling (1973) as Lady Franklin's mother
A Voyage Round My Father (1982, TV movie) as Mother
Farrington (1987, TV series) as Delia Murdock
The Play on One: The Dunroamin' Rising (1988, TV play) as Jean Sutherland
A Ghost in Monte Carlo (1990, TV movie) as Countess Kissler

References

External links

1921 births
2019 deaths
Actresses from Glasgow 
Alumni of RADA 
Scottish film actresses
Scottish stage actresses
Scottish television actresses
British expatriates in France